Anders Lindbäck (22 December 1803 – 20 November 1865) was a Swedish vicar who committed three murders; he is the first-known serial killer in Sweden. He was revealed and convicted in 1865.

Childhood and education 
Anders Lindbäck was born in Brålanda. His father Sven Andersson (1774-1822) was a poor farmer in Dalsland and his mother Lisa Olsdotter (died 1821) was a homemaker. During his childhood his family moved from parish to parish asking for alms. During this time he read a lot, which gave him a nickname "reading-Anders". His parents died when he was a teenager, after which his wealthy uncle Johan Nordahl took care of him. In 1820 his uncle helped him with the money for studies. Lindbäck first studied in Vänersborg and after 1824 in Katedralskolan in Skara. He was accepted at University of Uppsala in February 1829 where he was ordained a priest on 19 December 1831. It was a huge social move upward at that time.

He spent his first 30 years as a priest in Dalsland, specifically in Skållerud's parish. At the beginning of the 1860s he finally got a chance to be a vicar in the small parish of Silbodal in Värmland. Silbodal parish was poorer than Skållerud and that is why Anders' work was focused mainly on poverty and criminality in the region. During his stay in Skållerud he started a campaign against alcoholism and continued it when he moved to Silbodal.

Time in Silbodal 
He was accepted as a vicar in Silbodal in 1861. He got more power in this position: an opportunity to go through with his own concepts and ideas. The main goal was to create a parish free from poverty, full of hardworking people who have education opportunities. His vision was about creating order in both economy and existence of poor people in the parish. At that time the church was supporting 40 people, a heavy burden for such a small parish.

Lindbäck wanted to minimize the costs that the church was bearing. He established an advisory board of nine people, and together with them he set strict new rules about fighting the poverty in the region. One of their decisions was that only their own parishioners could receive help from the church. In general, the rules framing the list of those eligible for help became more stringent; some of them might even have been illegal.

Murder series 
Believing that the poor and sick cost the commune too much, Lindbäck came up with an economically-beneficial solution that also minimized the number of people who required support. Anders had a small bottle of wine, a cup, a sacramental wafer, and access to arsenic which he was adding to the wine. During the summer and winter of 1864, he made many home visits to people deliver supper and blessings, making it look like an act of mercy. Sometime after some of his visits, some people felt even worse than before instead of better. On 19 October 1864, a widow named Karin Persdotter was the first to die. Then, farm-worker Nils Pettersson died on 30 November, followed by Anders Lysén on 15 December 1864. Moreover, four other people were poisoned.

Disclosure 
The last murder struck the killer. Anders Lysén was ill but not poor. He was a wealthy businessman(?) and his sudden death made his relatives suspect that something was wrong. At the beginning of 1865 Anders Lysén's brother demanded that the grave should be opened. In March 1865 on the request of the local sheriff it was concluded that Anders Lysén died because of an arsenic poisoning. More graves were opened and it was noted that two more parishioners died of arsenic poisoning.

Anders Lindbäck was under suspicion partially because the funerals were made in a rush and also because he had granted 10000 Swedish crowns to estate.

Trial and death 
After this, Lindbäck was brought to justice, witnessed by a man named Daniel whose mother died after the priest's visit. Daniel himself had survived the poisoned supper five times, possibly because he did not like wine. 

During the first trial, which was held by the District Court on 11 June in Långelanda Courthouse, Anders Lindbäck confessed to three murders and three murder attempts. In his long defense speech he explained that he had done it in order to free those people from plagues. This speech did not help him and he was sentenced to death. The case was passed on to the Court of Appeal, which gave the District Court more time to revise the case and the legal process. The District Court investigated the case again but the penalty remained the same.

Before the sentence was executed, Anders Lindbäck hanged himself in the prison in Karlstad on 20 November 1865.

See also
List of serial killers by country

References

1803 births
1865 deaths
1860s suicides
19th-century Swedish criminals
Male serial killers
People convicted of murder by Sweden
Poisoners
Prisoners sentenced to death by Sweden
Prisoners who died in Swedish detention
Serial killers who committed suicide in prison custody
Suicides by hanging in Sweden
Swedish serial killers
Swedish people convicted of murder
Swedish people who died in prison custody
Swedish prisoners sentenced to death